Seo Kang-joon (born Lee Seung-hwan on October 12, 1993) is a South Korean actor and singer who is a member of the group 5urprise. He gained recognition with his role in the television series Cheese in the Trap (2016) and has since starred in Entourage (2016), Are You Human Too? (2018), The Third Charm (2018), Watcher (2019),  When The Weather Is Fine (2020), and Grid (2022).

Early life and education
Seo Kang-joon was born Lee Seung-hwan in Gunpo, Gyeonggi Province, South Korea. In the second year of secondary school, Seo went to study abroad in Malaysia for one year and seven months and returned to Korea in the first year of high school. After his debut, he enrolled at the Faculty of Performing Arts of Dong Seoul College. Seo worked part-time as a model before his debut. After passing the audition for Actor's League, a program with the aim of searching for new actors organized by Fantagio, Seo underwent training before debuting in the group 5urprise.

Career

2012–2015: Beginnings
Seo took on bit parts in various television series, before making his acting debut as with a supporting role in SBS' drama The Suspicious Housekeeper. His first major role was in the 2014 romantic comedy series Cunning Single Lady, for which he won the Best New Actor award at the 7th Korea Drama Awards.  He has then appeared in television dramas What Happens to My Family? (2014–2015), Splendid Politics (2015), and To Be Continued (2015), as well as films My Love, My Bride (2014) and Summer Snow (2015).

In 2014, Seo joined the SBS variety show Roommate as a cast member. He also appeared on Law of the Jungle as a guest.

2016–present: Rising popularity and leading roles
Seo's breakout role came in 2016 as a talented pianist in the college romance drama Cheese in the Trap. The same year, he starred in his first leading role in tvN drama Entourage, the Korean remake of the American television series of the same name.

In 2018, Seo starred in KBS's science fiction drama Are You Human? where he played double roles as a wealthy heir and robot. The same year, he starred in romance comedy drama The Third Charm.

In 2019, Seo starred in OCN's thriller drama Watcher as a policeman. He was cast in the JTBC romance drama When the Weather Is Fine, which aired in the first half of 2020. 

In 2022, Seo starred in Disney+ (Star) thriller drama Grid as an employee of the Grid Bureau.

Personal life

Military service 
On November 8, 2021, it was reported that Seo would enlist in the military on November 23, 2021. Later the same day, Seo's agency confirmed that he would enlist in the military on November 23, without revealing his location. Seo received the division commander's commendation for excellent performance in basic military training.and Seo is scheduled to be discharged from military service on May 22, 2023.

Filmography

Film

Television series

Variety show

Discography

Awards and nominations

References

External links
 
 
 

South Korean male television actors
South Korean male film actors
South Korean male idols
1993 births
Living people
People from Gunpo
People from Gyeonggi Province
21st-century South Korean male actors